De Burgh Fitzpatrick Persse (25 September 1840 – 17 February 1921) was a politician in Queensland, Australia. He was a Member of the Queensland Legislative Assembly.

Early life 
De Burgh Fitzpatrick Persse was born on 25 September 1840 in Moyode Castle, County Galway, Ireland.

Politics 
Presse was the Member of the Queensland Legislative Assembly for Fassifern from 9 April 1878 to 7 September 1883.

Later life 
Persse died on 17 February 1921 in Southport, Queensland, Australia. He was buried in Beaudesert on the local cemetery. He left his wife and two sons, Charles Persse and De Burgh B. Persse. and three daughters, Mrs. Fitz Pierce Joyce, Mrs. Edgar Joyce and Mrs. Cecil Delpratt.

References

Members of the Queensland Legislative Assembly
1840 births
1921 deaths